Kurumin Linux was a Live CD operating system based on Debian. Its main features are the advanced hardware auto-detection (inherited from Knoppix) and a Portuguese user interface, and its main goal is ease of use. As of release 7.0, the size of the disk image is approximately 603 MB.

Version NG 8.06, based on Ubuntu 8.04, was released June 24, 2008, and was discontinued on January 29, 2009.

Name origin and history
The name comes from the Tupi word "curumim", which means boy. The usage of the letter K, instead of the usual Portuguese spelling ("curumi" or "curumim"), brings it in line with KDE (Kurumin's default desktop environment), as well as with Knoppix.

In late 2007, Morimoto said, that the project would be halted or have its scope reduced. In November 2008, the project was officially discontinued.

Features 
The distribution sports an open-source control center named ClicaAki (roughly: "ClickHere"). It features a series of shell scripts, Kommander-based panels, and "magic icons" that install software not included on the live CD, and with which icons one can configure a wide range of networking options. The control center also provides access to the Synaptic package manager.

The ClicaAki control panel has shortcuts to scripts that also perform tasks like downloading and installing free games, with apps divided into categories and a short description of how they work and their differences.

Hardware support
The control panel also includes scripts for downloading and automatically configuring drivers for 3D video cards (ATI and Nvidia), a difficult task for novice users.

Another feature of the distro is, that it has support for many "winmodems", including some that have no official packages or drivers in the Debian repository, and also with scripts that automate the tasks of compiling and configuring the necessary modules.

With these features, Kurumin has spread the Linux operating system in Brazil in a level never seen before.

See also 

Poseidon Linux, a distribution based on Kurumin

External links

 Kurumin official site (in Portuguese)
 
 Oca do Kurumin (Fansite)
 LWN: Linux in Brazil

Knoppix
Portuguese-language Linux distributions
Discontinued Linux distributions
Linux distributions